HMS Squirrel was a Royal Navy 24-gun sixth rate, built in 1785 and broken up in 1817.

On 3 March 1806, Squirrel and Mediator left Cork, escorting a convoy for the West Indies. Squirrel was going to escort 12 merchantmen on to Demerara, Berbice, and Surinam. Squirrel, and  captured three ships on 6 September: Snelle, Jager, and Engesende.  shared by agreement with Lynx and Driver in the proceeds.

See also
 Gaspée Affair

References

External links
 

Sixth rates of the Royal Navy
1785 ships